Petra Martić was the defending champion, but chose to compete at the 2021 Western & Southern Open instead.

Clara Tauson won the title, defeating wildcard Emma Raducanu in the final, 6–1, 2–6, 6–4.

Seeds

Draw

Finals

Top half

Bottom half

Qualifying

Seeds

Qualifiers

Draw

First qualifier

Second qualifier

Third qualifier

Fourth qualifier

References

External Links
Main Draw
Qualifying Draw

Chicago Challenger - Singles
2021 Singles